Legends of Rupganj is a team that plays List A cricket in the Dhaka Premier Division. Rupganj, in Narayanganj District, just to the east of Dhaka, is the home town of the club's founding owner, Lutfar Rahman Badal.

History
Under their previous name, Gazi Tank Cricketers, they won the title in 2013–14. In the 2014–15 season, under their new name and ownership, they finished fifth.

 2014-15: 16 matches, won 8, finished fifth
 2015-16: 16 matches, won 9, finished third
 2016-17: 11 matches, won 6, finished seventh
 2017-18: 16 matches, won 10, finished second
 2018-19: 16 matches, won 13, finished second
 2021-22: 15 matches, won 11, finished second
The captains have been Alok Kapali and Shakib Al Hasan in 2014–15, Mosharraf Hossain in 2015–16, Mushfiqur Rahim and Naeem Islam in 2016–17, and Naeem Islam from 2017–18 to 2021–22.

Records
The team's highest score is 141 by Ashar Zaidi against Old DOHS Sports Club in the first match of the 2014–15 season. The best bowling figures are 6 for 33, performed twice: by Naeem Islam against Partex Sporting Club, in the second match of the 2014–15 season, and by Mohammad Sharif, who also took a hat-trick in the same innings, against Gazi Group Cricketers in 2017–18.

Current squad
Players with international caps are listed in bold

References

External links
 List A matches played by Legends of Rupganj

Dhaka Premier Division Cricket League teams